An equality impact assessment (EqIA) is a process designed to ensure that a policy, project or scheme does not unlawfully discriminate against any protected characteristic.

Definition 

The EqIA process aims to prevent discrimination against people who are members of a protected category. The Equality Act 2010 defines 9 protected characteristics:
Race
Religion or Belief
Disability
Sex
Gender Reassignment
Sexual Orientation
Age
Marriage or Civil Partnership 
Pregnancy and Maternity 

Within the UK, EqIAs is a means of ensuring that the public sector equality duty is met. On 19 November 2012, then Prime Minister David Cameron announced that EqIAs would no longer be undertaken for government decisions.

See also 

Social Impact Assessment
Environmental Impact Assessment
Health Impact Assessment
Sustainability Appraisal
Equality Act 2006
Equality Act 2010
Equal Opportunity

References

Further reading 

Bainard, J., Jones, A., Bateman, I., Lovett, A. & Fallon, P. (2001) Modelling
environmental equity: access to air quality in Birmingham, England Environment and
Planning A 2002, volume 34, pages 695 – 716

Burningham, K. & Thrush, D. (2001) Local environmental concerns in disadvantaged
neighbourhoods 

Capacity Global (2004) BME Communities Tackling Environmental and Social
Inequalities 

Davies, A. and Binsted, A. (2007) Environmental Equity and Equality Impact Assessment in the United Kingdom (07-1568) - TRB Annual Meeting Compendium of Papers CD-ROM, TRB 86th Annual Meeting, Washington D.C., January 2007 

Friends of the Earth (2000) Pollution injustice 

Friends of the Earth (2001) Pollution and Poverty – Breaking the Link

Gay, R., Jeffery, B., and Saunders, P. (2005) Burden of disease: environmental
inequalities 

Greater London Authority (2003) Equality Impact Assessments - How to do them  

Transport for London (2004) Equality Impact Assessments - How to do them 

Walker, G. Fairburn, J. Smith, G. and Mitchell, G. (2003) Environmental Quality and
Social Deprivation

External links 
UK Equality Act 2006 
UK Equality Bill 2009
IDEA EqIA guidance
TfL EqIA guidance

Management systems
Discrimination